Chitipat Kaeoyos (born 21 March 2003) is a Thai professional footballer who plays as a midfielder for Banbueng in the Thai League 3.

Club career

PTT Rayong
In 2019, at 16 years 6 months and 8 days, Chitipat became the youngest player to play for PTT Rayong after making his professional football debut against Chonburi in the Thai League 1. In addition, he also became the 4th youngest player to play in the Thai League 1.

Samut Prakan City
In 2021, Chitipat made his debut for Samut Prakan City against Muangthong United in the Thai League 1.

International career
Chitipat was part of the Thailand U16 squad in the 2018 AFC U-16 Championship.

References

External links

2003 births
Living people
Chitipat Kaeoyos
Chitipat Kaeoyos
Association football midfielders
Chitipat Kaeoyos
Chitipat Kaeoyos
Chitipat Kaeoyos
Chitipat Kaeoyos